Linda Purl (born September 2, 1955) is an American actress and singer, known for her roles as Ashley Pfister (Fonzie's girlfriend) on Happy Days (she originally played Gloria as Richie’s date in season 2 episode 6), Sheila Munroe in the 1982 horror film Visiting Hours, Pam Beesly's mother Helene in The Office, and Ben Matlock's daughter Charlene Matlock for the first season of the television series Matlock.

Early life
Purl was born on September 2, 1955 in Greenwich, Connecticut, to chemical-industry executive Raymond Charles Arthur Purl and Marshelline "Marshie" Purl. She has a sister, Mara. The girls' grandmother, Beatrice Saville, was a founder of the Actors' Equity Association. At age five, Purl moved with her family to Japan, where her father worked for Nippon Unicar. She spent her childhood there, and trained in acting at the Toho Geino Academy. While at the Imperial Theatre in Tokyo, Purl performed in several plays, gaining the role of Louis in The King and I, Bet in Oliver!, and Helen Keller in The Miracle Worker. Furthermore, she was discovered by Toho and appeared in several films.

At age 15, Purl returned to the United States. She attended high school at Wykeham Rise School, a private boarding school for girls, specializing in creative and performing arts, in Washington, Connecticut. While still in high school, she had a role on the soap opera The Secret Storm. After attending Finch College, Purl went to England to study under Marguerite Beale before returning to the United States to study at the Lee Strasberg Theatre and Film Institute and later with Robert Lewis.

Acting career

Film
After playing a small role in Jory (1973), Purl's first major movie role was in Jonathan Demme's 1975 comedy, Crazy Mama. Subsequent movie appearances have included W.C. Fields and Me (1976), Young Pioneers' Christmas (1976), Leo and Loree (1980), Visiting Hours (1982), The High Country (1984), Viper (1988), Natural Causes (1994), Mighty Joe Young (1998), The Perfect Tenant (2000), and Fear of the Dark (2003).

Television
Linda Purl has played several roles in television series, starting with The Secret Storm – a daytime "soap opera" drama (1973–1974). In 1978, she appeared as newlywed Molly Beaton in the ABC western drama series The Young Pioneers, set in the Dakota Territory of the 1870s and based on the novels of Rose Wilder Lane. She also acted alongside Shaun Cassidy in the 1979 TV movie Like Normal People. Also in 1979, she starred in "Women at West Point." On Happy Days she played two different roles: Richie's occasional girlfriend Gloria in season two of the show (1974) and Fonzie's steady girlfriend Ashley eight seasons later (1982–1983). She also played secret agent Kate Del'Amico in the short-lived series Under Cover and played Brett Robin in the 1994–1995 series Robin's Hoods.

She has also featured in many movies made for television, including Testimony of Two Men, The Night the City Screamed, Little Ladies of the Night, and Spies, Lies & Naked Thighs. She voiced Delilah in a 1985 direct-to-video episode of The Greatest Adventure: Stories from the Bible.

Purl appeared in an all-star cast in the well-regarded historical-biographical TV mini-series Eleanor and Franklin in 1976, broadcast on the American Broadcasting Company (ABC) television network. Here she portrayed Alice Roosevelt Longworth, daughter of President Theodore Roosevelt.

As a guest star, Purl appeared in a 1975 episode of the long-running Hawaiian-locale Hawaii Five-O called "The Hostage", as teenage babysitter "Ruth" held captive by a deranged veteran. She played two different roles on The Waltons;  early in its run, in 1974 when she played sophisticate Alicia in the season three episode "The Spoilers", and in the season five episode "The Heartbreaker" (1977), when she played Mary Ellen's sister-in-law (and Jason's love interest) Vanessa and sang a couple songs in the episode. In 1981, she starred in Manions of America. In 1984, she played Nydia, the blind flower girl in the miniseries "The Last Days of Pompeii". In 1985, she appeared in a Murder, She Wrote episode entitled "Murder at the Oasis". In 1988, she again made an appearance on Murder, She Wrote in the episode "Mourning Among The Wisterias" and in 1993, appeared for a third time on the series in "Dead Eye". In the first season of Matlock (1986–1987), (starring long-time comedy actor Andy Griffith, now in a usually dramatic role), Purl played Charlene, Ben Matlock's lawyer daughter. She was cast in the series First Monday (2002)  as Sarah Novelli, a real estate agent and Justice Joseph Novelli's wife.

Purl appeared in the role of Pam Beesly's mother on NBC's The Office TV series, starting with the season six episode "Niagara" in 2009–2010. Purl appeared in several more episodes throughout the series and was a romantic interest for Steve Carell's character. In May 2010, she made a guest appearance on Desperate Housewives. In 2011, Purl made guest appearances on Showtime's Homeland, playing Elizabeth Gaines.  She played Barbara Pelt, mother of Debbie Pelt, in two episodes of HBO's True Blood in 2012. In 2017, Purl appeared in one episode of Designated Survivor, playing an old college supervisor of President Kirkman who assists in appointing nominees to the Supreme Court in the episode "The Ninth Seat".

Theatre
Purl has been a regular performer (and was in the original cast) of international touring play Seven Deadly Sins Four Deadly Sinners. In November 2007, she appeared at the Théâtre Princesse Grace, Monte Carlo, directed by Marc Sinden, as part of Sinden's British Theatre Season, Monaco.

In 2008, Purl opened at the Cleveland Play House in Cleveland, Ohio in a production of The Glass Menagerie by Tennessee Williams, playing Amanda.

Music
Purl launched a jazz music career after leaving Matlock and has released several albums of music, including Out of This World – Live.

Personal life
Purl has been married and divorced four times. Her first marriage was in 1979 to Desi Arnaz Jr., son of Lucille Ball and Desi Arnaz. On January 3, 1980, Purl filed for divorce, which was finalized later that year. On November 5, 1988, she married screenwriter William Broyles Jr., whom she later divorced. On July 23, 1993, Purl married British screenwriter and producer Alexander Cary, Master of Falkland, with whom she has a son, Lucius, born February 6, 1995. They later divorced. On July 15, 2006, she married James Vinson Adams.
Since 2020, she has been in a relationship with Patrick Duffy.

Filmography

Film

Television

See also
 List of Matlock characters

References

External links
 
 
 Linda Purl (Aveleyman)

1955 births
Living people
Actresses from Greenwich, Connecticut
American soap opera actresses
American television actresses
American expatriates in Japan
Lee Strasberg Theatre and Film Institute alumni
Musicians from Greenwich, Connecticut
Finch College alumni
American School in Japan alumni
21st-century American women